Alto Rabagão Dam is a concrete dam on the Rabagão River, a left tributary of the Cávado River. It is located in Peneda-Gerês National Park, in the municipality Montalegre, in Vila Real District, Portugal.

Construction of the dam began in 1957. The dam was completed in 1964. It is owned by Companhia Portuguesa de Produção de Electricidade (CPPE). The dam is used for power production.

Dam
Alto Rabagão Dam is a 94 m tall (height above foundation) and 1,970 m long concrete dam, which is composed of an arch dam in the center and gravity dams on both sides. Its crest altitude is 880 m. The volume of the dam is 1,117,000 m³. The dam contains a crest spillway with 2 gates (maximum discharge 500 m³/s) and a bottom outlet (maximum discharge 360 m³/s).

Reservoir
At full reservoir level of 880 m (maximum flood level of 880.1 m) the reservoir of the dam has a surface area of 22.12 km² and its total capacity is 568.69 mio. m³. Its active capacity is 557.92 (550 or 550.1) mio. m³. Minimum operating level is 829 m. With the 550.1 mio. m³ water 973.1 GWh can be produced.

Power plant 
The pumped-storage hydroelectric power plant went operational in 1964. It is owned by CPPE, but operated by EDP. The plant has a nameplate capacity of 68 (72) MW. Its average annual generation is 85.2 (83 95 or 97) GWh.

The power station is located downstream and contains 2 reversible Francis turbine-generators with 36.75 MW (45 MVA), each in an underground powerhouse. The turbine rotation is 428 rpm. The minimum hydraulic head is 129 m, the maximum 185 m. Maximum flow per turbine is 25.7 m³/s. When pumping, each of the pumps has a maximum energy consumption of 31.7 MW and can pump 18 m³/s. The pumps are operated independently of the Francis turbines.

As lower reservoir for Alto Rabagão the reservoir of Venda Nova Dam is used.

See also

 List of power stations in Portugal
 List of dams and reservoirs in Portugal

References

Dams in Portugal
Pumped-storage hydroelectric power stations in Portugal
Arch dams
Dams completed in 1964
Energy infrastructure completed in 1964
1964 establishments in Portugal
Buildings and structures in Vila Real District
Reservoirs in Portugal
Underground power stations